Letter from an Unknown Woman is a 1948 American drama romance film released by Universal-International and directed by Max Ophüls (listed as Max Opuls in the opening credits sequence). It was based on the novella of the same name by Stefan Zweig.

In 1992, Letter from an Unknown Woman was selected for preservation in the United States National Film Registry by the Library of Congress as being "culturally, historically, or aesthetically significant". In July 2021, the film was shown in the Cannes Classics section at the 2021 Cannes Film Festival.

Plot
In late nineteenth century Vienna, Lisa, a teenager living in an apartment building, becomes fascinated by a new tenant, concert pianist Stefan Brand. Stefan is making a name for himself through energetic performances. Lisa becomes obsessed with Stefan, staying up late to listen to him play, and sneaking into his apartment and admiring him from a distance. Despite her actions, they only meet once and Stefan takes little notice of her.

One day, Lisa's mother announces her marriage to a wealthy and respectable gentleman, who lives in Linz, and tells Lisa that they will all move there. Lisa resists her mother's plans and runs away from the railway station and goes back to the apartment, where she is let in by the porter. She knocks on Stefan's door, but no one answers. She decides to wait outside for him to return. Early the next morning, Stefan returns home with another woman. After seeing the two, a distraught Lisa travels to Linz, where she joins her mother and new stepfather.

In Linz, she is transformed into a respectable woman and courted by a young military officer from a good family. He eventually proposes to Lisa, but she turns him down, saying that she is in love with someone else living in Vienna and is even engaged to be married to him. Confused and heartbroken, he accepts her situation. When they learn about Lisa's actions, her mother and stepfather demand to know why she did not accept the proposal. "I told him the truth," replies Lisa.

Years later, Lisa is estranged from her parents and works in Vienna as a dress model. Every night she waits outside Stefan's window, hoping to be noticed. One night he notices her, and although he does not recognize her, he finds himself strangely drawn to her. They go on a long, romantic date that ends with their making love. Soon after, Stefan leaves for a concert in Milan, promising to contact her soon, but he never does. Lisa eventually gives birth to their child, never trying to contact Stefan, wanting to be the "one woman you had known who asked you for nothing."

Ten years later, Lisa is now married to an older man named Johann who knows about her past love for Stefan, for whom she named their son. One day while at the opera, Lisa sees Stefan, who is no longer a top-billed musician and rarely performs. Feeling uneasy, she leaves during the performance. He sees her leave and follows her, and so they meet while she is waiting for her carriage. Stefan explains that he can't quite place her but felt they must have met before. Lisa is still uncomfortable with this, not wanting to anger her husband, and when her carriage arrives, she is met by a clearly vexed Johann.

A few nights later and against her husband's wishes, Lisa travels to Stefan's apartment, and he is delighted to see her. Despite a seemingly illuminating conversation about Stefan's past life and his motivations for giving up music, Stefan still does not recognize who Lisa really is. Distraught and realizing that Stefan never felt any love for her at all, Lisa leaves. On her way out she meets the servant and the two exchange a long glance. Sometime later, after her son dies of typhus, Lisa is taken to a hospital and is gravely ill herself. She writes a letter to Stefan explaining her life, her son, and her feelings toward him; the letter that narrates the whole film.

After Lisa dies, the letter is sent to Stefan, along with a card from the hospital staff announcing her death. In shock, Stefan thinks back to the three times they met and he failed to recognize her. "Did you remember her?", he asks his servant. The servant nods and writes down her full name, Lisa Berndle, on a piece of paper. Still in shock, Stefan leaves his building and sees the ghostly image of a teenage Lisa open the door for him, the same way she once did when he first noticed her all those years ago. Outside, a carriage waits to take him to meet a dueling opponent, Lisa's husband, Johann. Finally intending to take responsibility for his actions, Stefan decides to engage in the duel.

Cast
 Joan Fontaine as Lisa Berndle
 Louis Jourdan as Stefan Brand
 Mady Christians as Frau Berndle
  as Johann Stauffer
 Art Smith as John, mute butler
 Howard Freeman as Herr Kastner
 Carol Yorke as Marie
 John Good as Lt. Leopold von Kaltnegger
 Leo B. Pessin as Stefan Jr
 Erskine Sanford as Porter
 Otto Waldis as Concierge
 Sonya Waldis as Frau Spitzer
Uncredited
Betty Blythe as Frau Kohner
John Elliott as Flower Vendor 
Ilka Grüning as Ticket-Taker
Roland Varno as Stefan's Second

Adaptation notes

The film was adapted from the Stefan Zweig novella by screenwriter Howard Koch. There are divergences between the film and the book. The male protagonist in the book is simply referred to (once) as 'R', and is a novelist rather than a musician. The film renames him Stefan Brand (referencing Zweig, who also lends his name to the protagonist's infant son, also unnamed in the original source material). The "unknown woman" receives no name in the book; in the film she is called Lisa Berndle (a quirk of Ophüls is having his female characters names' starting with an L). Fernand, a relative of Lisa's mother and eventual husband, is turned into the completely unrelated "Mr. Kastner", with the family moving to Linz rather than Innsbruck. John, the servant, retains his name, but in the film, he is mute.

The novel's sexual content is quite implicit, but because of censorship, the movie adaptation further dims it. In the book, the "unknown woman" spends three nights with the writer (rather than one) before his departure. She meets him only one more time, many years later, at the opera, at which she promptly loses her present lover in favor of spending a fourth night with the writer. At the conclusion of this, she is humiliated when he mistakes her for a prostitute, and rushes off, never to see him again. The movie adaptation splits these into two separate encounters (first meeting him at the opera, and then rushing off humiliated from his house), and ignores another sexual encounter.

Further divergences include a more prolonged "first encounter" between the two lovers (taking them through stagecoaches, fairs and ball rooms rather than simply cutting to the long-waited sexual encounter), revealing the disease that kills Stefan Jr. and Lisa to be typhus and ignoring Lisa's tradition of sending Brand white roses every birthday. At the start of the novel, Brand has just turned 41 (and forgotten about his birthday). This is significant because the absence of white roses confirms Lisa's death at the time of reading.

The most significant divergence is a structural change: there is no duel in the original story, nor is there a character such as Johann. The "unknown woman" from the book never marries, but lives off a series of lovers who remain unnamed and mostly unintrusive. Because of this, the protagonist's actions offend no one in particular. In the film, Brand is challenged to a duel, which he initially plans to ditch. The finale reveals the contestant to be Johann, who demands satisfaction over Lisa's affair. Having read Lisa's letter, Brand boldly accepts the duel and walks into it, his fate uncertain. This redeeming action has no literary equivalent. In fact, Brand's literary equivalent can only faintly recall Lisa after reading the letter, and there's no significant event past this.

Reception
The film lost money for Universal on its initial release.

Letter from an Unknown Woman is very highly regarded by today's critics. Tim Dirks of Filmsite has listed it among the 100 greatest American movies of all time, and the film holds 100% approval among 22 critics on Rotten Tomatoes.

The film is recognized by American Film Institute in these lists:
 2002: AFI's 100 Years...100 Passions – Nominated

Home media release
Rights to the film were transferred from Universal to NTA (with Paramount being the current holder). The film first appeared on VHS tapes in 1988 under the Republic Pictures Home Video label. In 1992, it was released on laserdisc by Republic Pictures and The Criterion Collection, with the latter containing an essay by Charles Dennis.

Olive Films released the film on DVD and Blu-ray on October 16, 2012. It was re-released on Blu-ray on December 5, 2017, as a part of the Olive Signature series. This edition was limited to 3,500 pressed units and contains a new 4K video restoration, bonus features such as audio commentary, videos with interviews and analyses, and the opening Universal-International logo being restored (it was cut in previous releases), a booklet containing an essay by Molly Haskell, and optional English subtitles.

References

External links

Filmsite.org essay
Senses of Cinema essay by  Alexander Dhoest
Senses of Cinema essay by Carla Marcantonio
Letter from an Unknown Woman at Louisjourdan.net
Letter from an Unknown Woman essay by Daniel Eagan in America's Film Legacy: The Authoritative Guide to the Landmark Movies in the National Film Registry, Bloomsbury Academic, 2010 , pages 414-416 

1948 films
1948 romantic drama films
American romantic drama films
American black-and-white films
1940s English-language films
Films based on short fiction
Films based on works by Stefan Zweig
Films directed by Max Ophüls
Films set in the 1890s
Films set in the 1900s
Films set in Vienna
United States National Film Registry films
Universal Pictures films
Films with screenplays by Howard Koch (screenwriter)
Films scored by Daniele Amfitheatrof
1940s American films